Maspujols is a municipality in the comarca of Baix Camp, in the province of Tarragona, Catalonia, Spain. This town is first mentioned in medieval documents in the year 1172 under King Alfons II of Aragon.

Villages
Maspujols, 516 
Rocabruna, 26

References

Tomàs Bonell, Jordi; Descobrir Catalunya, poble a poble, Prensa Catalana, Barcelona, 1994

External links

Maspujols Town Hall webpage
 Government data pages 

Municipalities in Baix Camp
Populated places in Baix Camp